Krokus (also known - by the band in particular - as First Album) is the first album by Swiss rock band Krokus. It was the only Krokus album to feature Hansi Droz and Remo Spadino. It is also the only Krokus album to show a progressive rock style. The album has become a collector's item since only 560 copies were ever pressed and it has never been made available since.

Track listing

Personnel
 Tommy Kiefer - lead and backing vocals, lead guitar
 Hansi Droz - rhythm guitar
 Remo Spadino - bass
 Chris von Rohr - drums, backing and lead vocals, piano, percussion
Additional musicians
 Rebo (Ribo B. Boulding) - congas (2, 8, 10)
 Peter Richard - vocals
 Eric Mertz - emotional vocals (9)

References

Krokus (band) albums
1976 debut albums